Arthur Poole may refer to:

 Arthur Poole (footballer), footballer for Port Vale
 Arthur Poole (cricketer, born 1907) (1907–1979), English cricketer
 Arthur Poole (cricketer, born 1878) (1878–1955), New Zealand cricketer

See also
Arthur Pole (disambiguation)